The Vancil Spitz S1 is an American homebuilt aircraft that was designed and produced by A. Vancil of Belton, South Carolina, introduced in the late 1990s. When it was available the aircraft was supplied as a kit and also in the form of plans for amateur construction.

Design and development
The Spitz S1 is an ultralight replica of the Pitts S-1 aerobatic biplane. It features a biplane layout, a single-seat open cockpit, fixed conventional landing gear and a single engine in tractor configuration.

It can also be placed in the Experimental - Amateur-built category.

The Spitz S1 is made from metal tubing and wood, with its flying surfaces and tail covered in doped aircraft fabric and the fuselage covered in sheet aluminium. The standard engine used is the  Christine Aero powerplant.

Variants
S1 ultralight version
S1 homebuilt version

Specifications (version)

References

S1
1990s United States sport aircraft
1990s United States ultralight aircraft
Single-engined tractor aircraft
Biplanes
Replica aircraft
Homebuilt aircraft